Schizothorax prenanti, also known as Ya-fish, is a species of ray-finned fish in the genus Schizothorax from the middle and upper parts of the Yangtze basin in China. It is also known as Yayu, as it is native to the city of Ya'an, Sichuan.

References 

Schizothorax
Taxa named by Tchang Tchung-Lin
Fish described in 1930